The Allens Creek Nuclear Power Plant was a proposed nuclear power plant to be located at Wallis, Texas, less than 50 miles from the western edge of Houston. The plant, consisting of two 1,150 MWe General Electric boiling water reactors, was ordered by Houston Lighting and Power Company (HL&P) in 1973, but public opposition, fueled in part by press coverage of problems at other nuclear plants around the country, led to lengthy public hearings and court action. In the meantime, construction costs escalated and the plant was officially canceled in 1982.

See also

Anti-nuclear movement in the United States
List of books about nuclear issues
Nuclear power debate
Nuclear power in the United States
Bodega Bay Nuclear Power Plant
Black Fox Nuclear Power Plant

References

External links
 Cancelled Nuclear Units Ordered in the United States 

Austin County, Texas
Cancelled nuclear power stations in the United States
Nuclear power plants in Texas